N-Methylconiine is a poisonous alkaloid found in poison hemlock in small quantities.

Isolation and properties 
The -(+)-stereoisomer of N-methylconiine is reported to occur in hemlock in small quantities, and methods for its isolation are described by Wolffenstein and by von Braun. It is a colourless, oily, coniine-like liquid, specific rotation [α]D +81.33° at 24.3 °C. The salts are crystalline ("B" marks one molecule of the base): the hydrochloride, B•HCl, forms masses of needles, mp. 188 °C; the platinichloride, B2•H2PtCl6, has mp. 158 °C.

The -(−)-stereoisomer was obtained by Ahrens from residues left in the isolation of coniine as hydrobromide or by removing coniine as the nitroso-compound. It is a colourless, coniine-like liquid, bp. 175.6 °C/767 mmHg, specific rotation [α]D −81.92° at 20 °C. The monohydrochloride crystallises in leaflets, mp. 191–192 °C; the monohydrobromide in leaflets, mp. 189–190 °C; the platinichloride in orange crystals, mp. 153–154 °C; the aurichloride in leaflets, mp. 77–78 °C; and the picrate in long needles, mp. 121–122 °C.

Synthesis 
N-Methyl--coniine was prepared by the action of potassium methyl sulfate on coniine by Passon. Hess and Eichel have shown that -coniine with formaldehyde and formic acid yields an active N-methyl--coniine, and that methyl-isopelletierine hydrazone yields N-methyl--coniine when heated with sodium ethoxide at 150–170 °C.

References 

Piperidine alkaloids
Neurotoxins